This is a list of films shot partially or in full with IMAX cameras, either on 15/70 film, with the Phantom 65 IMAX 3D, with the ARRI Alexa IMAX, with other IMAX-certified digital cameras or IMAX Live Events shot with IMAX-certified cameras.

Films that may have been projected onto IMAX screens using a standard 35mm print, such as Star Wars: Episode III – Revenge of the Sith, are not listed. The US premiere dates are displayed where available. Due of the ease of downconverting, most IMAX 3D films have also been remastered and exhibited in 2D, with an appropriate name change (for example Space Station 3D becomes Space Station).

Films shot entirely with IMAX 70mm cameras

Films shot partially with IMAX 70mm cameras

Films shot entirely with IMAX-certified digital cameras

Films shot partially with IMAX-certified digital cameras

IMAX Live Events shot entirely with IMAX-certified digital cameras

See also
List of IMAX DMR films
List of IMAX-based rides

References

IMAX